Gerald "Jerry" McClearn (July 28, 1927 – January 5, 2017) was an American behavior geneticist and professor emeritus of health and human development and biobehavioral health at the Pennsylvania State University.

Education
McClearn received his undergraduate degree from Allegheny College and took his Ph.D. in psychology at University of Wisconsin. After two year-long spells as instructor at Yale University, and then assistant professor of psychology at Allegheny College, he took up postdoctoral positions at the University of Edinburgh, Scotland, and University College London.

Career
McClearn was on staff at the Department of Psychology at  University of California, Berkeley from 1956 to 1965. He then joined the faculty of the Department of Psychology at University of Colorado Boulder, as an associate professor. Promoted to full professor, he remained at Boulder until 1981.

Early on at Colorado, McClearn planned to form a research institute dedicated to research and teaching in behavioral genetics; he subsequently founded the Institute for Behavioral Genetics at the University of Colorado at Boulder in 1966, and was an early member of the Behavior Genetics Association, becoming one of its first presidents in 1974.

He was the recipient of the Dobzhansky Award in 1989, the Robert W. Kleemeier Award from the Gerontological Society of America (2009) "in recognition for outstanding research in the field of gerontology”, and the Fondation Ipsen's Longevity Prize.

Selected works

Books

References

External links 
 Gerald E. McClearn faculty page

2017 deaths
1927 births
People from Mercer County, Pennsylvania
Behavior geneticists
20th-century American psychologists
Allegheny College alumni
Pennsylvania State University faculty
University of Colorado Boulder faculty
Fellows of the American Association for the Advancement of Science